Cleodoxus claviger is a species of longhorn beetles of the subfamily Lamiinae. It was described by Henry Walter Bates in 1885, and is known from Costa Rica and Panama.

References

Beetles described in 1885
Acanthocinini